Fool's Quest is the second book in the epic fantasy trilogy Fitz and the Fool, written by American author Robin Hobb. It was published by HarperCollins and released in August, 2015 and continues the story of FitzChivalry Farseer and his daughter Bee after the events of Fool's Assassin, published in 2014.

Plot summary 

Fitz and Riddle and the Fool arrive at Buckkeep. Fitz has used too much of Riddle's strength and Nettle is furious. They cannot risk a Skill-healing for the Fool since he is too weak. They have arrived for Winterfest. Fitz is to play the part of a minor noble to explain his presence. He tries to heal the Fool as best he can. 
The Fool tells him how he returned to Clerres with Prillkop and that the Servants, the pale people who tend to While Prophets, are the ones who tortured him. They wanted him to tell them where the Unexpected Son was. The Fool thought they meant a son he was supposed to have, although the Fool knew of no such child.

Web asks Fitz to meet a crow who is not bonded with a human, but is in danger from other crows by having white feathers among her black ones. She can speak some words. Through Fitz, she meets the Fool and they connect. The Fool names her Motley. Fitz paints her white feathers black so that she can go out without being attacked by regular crows.

Chade has a new apprentice - Ash. Ash is very capable and both Fitz and the Fool grow to like him.

Eliannia recognizes Nettle and Riddle's unborn child and thinks it will be a girl. She wants to claim the child for her Motherhouse. In doing so, she recognizes Nettle as Fitz's daughter. In turn, Dutiful recognizes Fitz and he is crowned Prince FitzChivalry.

Fitz arrives back at Withywoods through the pillars. The staff do not remember what happened and do not remember Bee or Shun. Per is the only one who knows what happened. The staff - including his own mother - do not recognize him. 
Chade and Thick arrive and they revive the staff's memory with elfbark tea. Everyone is even more upset. Trying to return to
Chade reveals that both Lant and Shun (really named Shine) are both his children from different mothers.

Returning to Buckkeep, Chade is in very bad shape from the attack. 
The Fool is recovering. Ash has given him dragon blood which has turned his eyes gold. 
Fitz discovers Ash is really a girl - Spark - who can shift back and forth between being Ash and Spark, at Chade's encouragement.

Meanwhile, the Servants took Bee and Shun on a long journey. They make Shun and Bee tired and sleepy. Shun tells Bee to make sure they don't realize she is a girl, since they think she is a boy. Shun thinks that this is the only reason they are keeping Bee and Shun alive. Bee becomes very ill with a high fever and begins to shed her skin. She is whiter underneath.
Ellik and his mercenaries figure out that the Servants are controlling them using Vindeliar. They take Vindeliar with them to town to test his powers and pillage. 
Once they get back to camp with all of their loot, they get drunk. Hogen, the handsome rapist, convinces Ellik to let him have one of the women. He gives him Odessa, one of the Servants. 
Shun realizes what is happening and drags Bee away. The two of them try to escape.

Fitz in the meantime is told by Chade, Dutiful and Nettle that they have figured out where Bee and Shine are. Soldiers are sent to intercept the Servants and their Chalcedean mercenaries. Fitz decides not to wait and leave immediately on the horse he took by accident in the earlier book, Fleeter. He does not want to have her as a wit-partner, but Fleeter is very interested in having a relationship and converses with him. 
Riddle, Lant and Per catch up with Fitz, wanting to join him in finding Bee and Shun immediately. When they stop for the night, Fitz drugs them all and leaves. He and Fleeter catch up with the Servants. Motely the crow flies with them and tells Fitz there is "red snow" ahead. Fitz finds the Servants camp in disarray with many of the soldiers dead - apparently killed each other - some of the Servants dead and Bee and Shun gone. Ellik and Hogen remain. Hogen is hurt and cannot see or hear Ellik.
Fitz first subdues Ellik and tries to get him to tell him what happened and who hired him to kidnap Bee. He is only partially successful and understands that Ellik agreed to follow the Servants and help them find the Unexpected Son for gold and in hope of regaining his status as heir to the Chaldean throne.
Fitz then attacks and subdues Hogen, threatening to castrate him and gets him to explain the rest of what happened.
It seems that when raping Odessa, Dwalia the leader of the luriks, tried to stop them. They attacked Dwalia and Vindeliar became distressed. His panic spilled over into the camp, turning soldiers against each other.

References

External links 
 Official website of Robin Hobb

2015 American novels
American fantasy novels
Novels by Robin Hobb
Del Rey books
Voyager Books books